Camden State Park is a state park on the Redwood River in southwestern Minnesota near Marshall. It is used for picnics, camping, hiking, and other outdoor recreation.

The park, originally known as Camden Woods, was acquired in 1934, and development started in 1935 with workers from the Veterans Conservation Corps, an offshoot of the Civilian Conservation Corps. The landscape design in the park was planned by the National Park Service, and the master-planned development allowed the Redwood River to determine the placement of various functional areas in the park.  After the VCC finished their development in 1936, the Works Progress Administration dismantled the VCC camp buildings and built the Swimming Instructor's Cabin and the Ice and Wood House.  Thirteen buildings and structures, built by the VCC and the WPA, are listed on the National Register of Historic Places.

A 1971 study by the Minnesota Academy of Science and The Nature Conservancy found that Camden State Park contained one of the westernmost natural occurrences of the sugar maple in North America.

In the 1980s, the park began a prairie restoration project. The original sites were two acres or less in size, and contained about 35 grasses and wildflowers. The prairie plants have been maintained and expanded, in part through the use of controlled burns.

Species

References

External links

Camden State Park

1935 establishments in Minnesota
Civilian Conservation Corps in Minnesota
Historic districts on the National Register of Historic Places in Minnesota
Park buildings and structures on the National Register of Historic Places in Minnesota
Protected areas established in 1935
Protected areas of Lyon County, Minnesota
Rustic architecture in Minnesota
State parks of Minnesota
Works Progress Administration in Minnesota
National Register of Historic Places in Lyon County, Minnesota